Frederick Thomas Middleton (2 August 1930 – 8 April 2016) was an English professional footballer who made 300 appearances in the Football League playing for Lincoln City.

Life and career
Middleton was born in West Hartlepool, County Durham, and attended the town's Technical Day School. He began his football career as a junior with Newcastle United, and spent several years there as a professional, but never played in the Football League before moving on to Lincoln City in 1954.

Middleton played regularly for Lincoln at wing half, remaining with the club as they fell from the Second to the Fourth Division. Middleton left the club in 1964, having scored 16 goals from 316 games in all competitions, a total which at the time placed him fifth in Lincoln's all-time appearances list.

References

1930 births
2016 deaths
People from West Hartlepool
Footballers from Hartlepool
English footballers
Association football wing halves
Newcastle United F.C. players
Lincoln City F.C. players
Skegness Town A.F.C. players
English Football League players